Playa Kanoa is a beach on the Caribbean island of Curaçao, located to the north of Willemstad. It is one of the few beaches on the northern side of the island. Surfing is a popular activity on the beach. There is a snack bar as well as a fish restaurant, and there is a nearby fisherman's village.

References

Beaches of Curaçao